Trulshik Rinpoche Ngawang Chökyi Lodrö (khrul zhig ngag dbang chos kyi blo gros) (1 January 1923 – 2 September 2011) born in Yardrok Taklung, Central Tibet was one of the main teachers of the 14th Dalai Lama and of many of the younger generation of Nyingma lamas today including Sogyal Rinpoche. He is considered the spiritual heir of several senior Nyingma masters of the last century such as Dudjom Rinpoche and Dilgo Khyentse Rinpoche. Rinpoche is the subject of a documentary film Destroyer of Illusion narrated by Richard Gere.
Trulshik Rinpoche founded the monastery of Thubten Chöling in Nepal. In 2010 he became the official head of the Nyingma school.

Rinpoche lived in Solukhumbu, Nepal.

Trulshik Rinpoche died on September 2, 2011, and was succeeded by Taklung Tsetrul Rinpoche who accepted the position on 22 March 2012.

His reincarnation, or Yangsi, Ngawang Tendzin Lodrö Rabsel (Tib. ངག་དབང་བསྟན་འཛིན་བློ་གྲོས་རབ་གསལ་), was born in Kathmandu on July 25, 2013 and recognized in 2015.

References

External links
listing at TibetanLama.com with date of birth
Chiwongmonastery.com

1923 births
2011 deaths
Nyingma lamas
Rinpoches
Tibetan Buddhists from Tibet
Chinese emigrants to Nepal
People from Solukhumbu District